Richard Stratton may refer to:
 Richard A. Stratton (born 1931), American naval officer
 Richard Stratton (college president) (born 1958), American academic administrator
 Richard Stratton (artist) (born 1970), New Zealand ceramic artist

See also
 Rick Stratton, makeup and special effects artist